The 1951 Nobel Prize in Literature was awarded the Swedish author Pär Lagerkvist  "for the artistic vigour and true independence of mind with which he endeavours in his poetry to find answers to the eternal questions confronting mankind." Lagerkvist is the fourth Swedish recipient of the Nobel Prize in Literature after Lagerlöf in 1909, Von Heidenstam in 1916, and Karlfeldt in 1931.

Laureate

Pär Lagerkvist wrote novels, poetry, plays, short stories and essays and were one of major Swedish literary figures of the first half of the 20th century. In his early years Lagerkvist supported modernist and aesthetically radical views, as shown by his manifesto Ordkonst och bildkonst ("Word Art and Picture Art", 1913) and the play Den Svåra Stunden ("The Difficult Hour", 1918). In 1916, he published Ångest ("Anguish"), a violent and disillusioned collection of poems. The novel Bödeln ("The Hangman", 1933) and the play Mannen utan själ ("The Man Without a Soul", 1936) expresses Lagerkvist's indignation over rising fascism. A recurring theme in his writings is the fundamental question of good and evil, and the problem of man's relation to God. This theme is particularly notable in the 1944 novel Dvärgen ("The Dwarf"), which became his first major success, followed by Barabbas (1950), a novel that won Lagerkvist world recognition. His works also include the notable autobiographical novel Gäst hos verkligheten ("Guest of Reality", 1925), and two of his most important works, the collection of poems Aftonland ("Evening Land", 1953) and the novel Sibyllan ("The Sibyl", 1956), which were published after he was awarded the Nobel prize.

Deliberations

Nominations
Pär Lagerkvist had first been proposed for the prize in 1947. Following the publication of his novel Barabbas, Lagerkvist had been one of the favourites to be awarded the Nobel Prize in Literature in 1950. In 1951 the Nobel committee for literature received nine nominations for Lagerkvist, including nominations from the French authors and previous laureates André Gide and Roger Martin du Gard, and the Swedish Academy decided to award him the prize.

In total the Nobel committee received 44 nominations for 25 individuals including Taha Hussein, Paul Claudel, Winston Churchill (awarded in 1953), Ramón Menéndez Pidal, Tarjei Vesaas and Halldór Kiljan Laxness (awarded in 1955). The Greek authors Nikos Kazantzakis and Angelos Sikelianos were nominated both individually and for a shared prize by academy member Sigfrid Siwertz. The Spanish writer José Ortega y Gasset were nominated by 18 members of the Royal Spanish Academy. Six of the nominees were newly nominated among them Ezequiel Martínez Estrada, Katharine Susannah Prichard, Rómulo Gallegos, José Maria Ferreira de Castro, and María Enriqueta Camarillo. Two women were nominated namely the Australian author Katherine Susannah Prichard and the Mexican writer Maria Enriqueta Camarillo.

The authors Antoine Bibesco, Algernon Blackwood, Tadeusz Borowski, James Bridie, Abraham Cahan, Émile Chartier, Lloyd C. Douglas, René Guénon, Fumiko Hayashi, Sadegh Hedayat, Louis Lavelle, Henri-René Lenormand, Richard Malden, Margaret Mayo, Oscar Micheaux, Takashi Nagai, Andrei Platonov, Pedro Salinas, Božena Slančíková (known as Timrava), Henry De Vere Stacpoole, Vsevolod Vishnevsky, Henrik Visnapuu, Ludwig Wittgenstein, and Miyamoto Yuriko died in 1951 without having been nominated for the prize.

Reactions
Although several Nordic and Swedish authors had been awarded the Nobel Prize in Literature before and Lagerkvist himself was a member of the awarding institution the Swedish Academy, the decision to award him was defended as a legitimate choice in the Swedish press by critics Erik Hjalmar Linder and Sten Selander, saying the internationally recognised Lagerkvist undoubtedly deserved the prize. Selander argued that Lagerkvist was a classic modernist in the same class as the two recent laureates William Faulkner and T. S. Eliot.

Banquet speech
At the banquet at Stockholm City Hall on 10 December 1951, Pär Lagerkvist thanked his colleagues in the Swedish Academy for the honour of awarding him the Nobel Prize and then read a piece from an unpublished novel written in 1922 called Myten och människan ("The Myth and the human being"). "I found that the beginning of it roughly includes just what I was going to say here today, but in the form of fiction, which undeniebly suits me better", Lagerkvist said, "It is about the mysterious of our essence and our existence, about this what makes the destiny of the human being so grand - and so difficult."

References

1951
Nobel Prize